is a Japanese pink film actor and director from Osaka, Japan. He has been called "one of the most individual actors" in the world of pink film.

Life and career
Shimomoto was born in Osaka, Japan on August 14, 1948. He started his career as an actor in director Banmei Takahashi’s pink films in the early 1970s. He has worked with Takahashi in many other films and has also starred in the works of other noted filmmakers, including, Kōji Wakamatsu, Akira Fumakachi, Kazuyuki Izutsu, and Shūji Kataoka among others, amassing a filmography of more than 250 pink films. He was given a Best Actor award at the first annual Pink Grand Prix covering the year 1988, and a second in 2006 for his performance in Shinji Imaoka's Mighty Extreme Woman a.k.a. Uncle's Paradise. Shimomoto was given a Best New Director, 2nd place award at the Pink Grand Prix for that year. Recently he has also starred in mainstream films and TV shows.

Selected filmography
 Virgin Rope Makeover (1979)
 Waisetsu dokyumento renzoku henshitsu ma (Shintōhō Eiga, 1980)
 Girl Mistress ( - Shōjo jōfu, Takahashi, 1980)
 Inquisition of a Girl Saint ( - Sei shōjo gomon, Wakamatsu, 1980)
 Attacked Woman ( - Yarareta onna, Takahashi, 1981)
 Crazy Affair:  Pacifier ( - Kurutta joji: oshaburi, Isomura, 1981)
 Tattoo Ari ( - TATTOO <shisei> Ari, Takahashi Prod., 1982)
 Abused Slave Girl ( - Gyakutai dorei shōjo, Yoneda, 1983)
 Cruel Documentary: Domesticated Animal Doll ( - Zankoku document: kachiku ningyo, 1983)
 Girl And The Wooden Horse Torture ( - Dan Oniroku Shōjo Mokuba-zeme, Kato, 1983)
 Serial Rape: Attack! ( - Renzoku Boko: Okasu!, Fukuoka, 1983)
 Office Lady: Wet and Falling ( - OL: nurete ochiru, Masuda, 1983)
 Female Prisoners: Brutal Treatment (Joshu zankoku shikei, Kataoka, 1984)
 High  Noon Ripper ( - Mahiru no kirisaki-ma, Takita, 1984)
 Abnormal Family: Older Brother's Bride ( - Hentai kazoku: aniki no yome-san, Suō, 1984)
 Disgraced! Uniform Virgin (凌辱！制服処女 - Ryojoku! seifuku shojo, Fukuoka, 1985)
 Mad Love! Lolita Poaching ( - Gekiai Lolita mitsuro, Satō, 1985)
 S&M Hunter Begins a.k.a. Hanging Upside-Down Bondage ( - Sakasa Tsurushi Shibari-nawa, Kataoka, 1985)
 S&M Hunter - Legend of Yakuza　（SM倫子のおもらし) (1986)
 S&M Hunter a.k.a. Bondage SM: 18 Years Old (Kinbaku • SM • 18-sai, Kataoka, 1986)
 Almost Ripe Madonna: Tasty Big Thighs ( - Hanjuku madonna: oishii futomomo, Fukuoka, 1987)
 Call Girl Angel: Trap of Disgrace ( - Hotetoru tenshi: chijoku no wana - Chinzei, 1988)
 Genuine Masturbation: Finger Play ( - Honban onanie: shigi, 1988, Yoneda)
 Subway Serial Rape: Lover Hunting ( - Chikatetsu Renzoku Reipu: Aijin-Gari, 1988, Kataoka)
 High Class Call Girls: Ladies from Hell ( - The kokyu baishun: jigoku no kifujin, Kataoka, 1990)
 Inamura Jane ( (1990)
 Serial Masturbation: Disorder ( - Renzoku onanie: midareppanashi, Ueno, 1994)
 The Dream of Garuda (1994)
 Anarchy in Japansuke (1999)
 Tokyo Booty Nights (2004)
 Uncle's Paradise (2006)
 No Place to Go (2022), Sensei

References

External links
 
 

Living people
Japanese male film actors
Pink film actors
1948 births